Trachelyopterichthys anduzei is a species of driftwood catfish endemic to Venezuela where it is found in the upper Orinoco River basin.  It grows to a length of 14.0 cm.

References 
 

 

Auchenipteridae
Taxa named by Carl J. Ferraris Jr.
Taxa named by Justa María Fernández R.
Fish described in 1987
Fish of South America